Peter Gottwald Jr. is an American paralympian athlete competing mainly in category T13 middle distance events.

Biography
He competed in the 2004 Summer Paralympics in Athens, Greece.  There he finished fifth in the men's 800 meters - T13 event and finished eighth in the men's 1,500 meters - T13 event.  He also competed at the 2008 Summer Paralympics in Beijing, China. There he won a silver medal in the men's 800 meters - T13 event, finished tenth in the men's 1,500 meters - T13 event and went out in the first round of the men's 5,000 meters - T13 event

In 2003, he graduated from California High School.

Gottwald graduated from West Chester University in Pennsylvania with a teaching degree in the field of health and physical education.

External links
 

Paralympic track and field athletes of the United States
Athletes (track and field) at the 2004 Summer Paralympics
Athletes (track and field) at the 2008 Summer Paralympics
Paralympic silver medalists for the United States
Living people
West Chester University alumni
Year of birth missing (living people)
Medalists at the 2008 Summer Paralympics
Paralympic medalists in athletics (track and field)
American male middle-distance runners
Medalists at the 2007 Parapan American Games